Aesc may refer to; 

Æsc, Old English for "ash" (tree):
 Æsc (rune) (ᚫ), a rune of the Anglo-Saxon fuþorc and a continuation of the Elder Fuþark ansuz (ᚨ)
 Æ, a letter of the Old English alphabet
Oisc of Kent, sometimes called Aesc, a legendary early leader of the Anglo-Saxon kingdom of Kent 
Automotive Energy Supply Corporation (AESC), manufacturer of lithium based batteries for electric vehicles
Aesc., abbreviation for the tree genus Aesculus